Beth Tikvah or Beit Tikvah ( "House of Hope") may refer to the following synagogues:
 Congregation Beth Tikvah, Dollard-des-Ormeaux, Quebec
 Beth Tikvah Synagogue (Toronto), Ontario
 Beit Tikvah of Ottawa, Ontario

See also